Guo Meimei (born 15 June 1991), born as Guo Meiling, is a Chinese Internet celebrity who was involved in some scandals and crimes.

Life and career
Guo was born in Yiyang, Hunan in 1991, living with her mother in Yiyang and Shenzhen when she was a child. She went to Beijing Film Academy in 2008.

Guo's mother, Guo Dengfeng, said in "Larry Lang Live", a Chinese Business News television program, that she raised her daughter alone after her divorce. But they had an affluent life due to successful stock market investments. Before her daughter was born, Guo Dengfeng was already a millionaire and owned two properties in Shenzhen City through fortunes made from buying stock. Guo Dengfeng said she attempted to make up for the mental losses felt by her daughter due to the divorce by buying her luxury goods.

Guo said she intended to seek a career in the entertainment industry and had posted her assistant's mobile phone number on her Weibo page.

Lifestyle
On Guo's  Sina Weibo page, she posted photos of her collection of Hermes bags and her Maserati car. She said only two of the Hermes bags she showed were authentic - one was a gift from her mother on her 18th birthday and the other was from Wang Jun, a real estate developer from Shenzhen City, south China's Guangdong Province. During "Larry Lang Live", Guo said that she used to be a thrifty girl who always remembered to turn off lights to save electricity. Guo said she was an "honest girl at heart" who had become entranced with luxury living after studying at the Beijing Film Academy, where she made friends with rich people.

Due to her wealth, she was given the nickname Queen of the Fuerdais (fuerdai, Classical Chinese for "rich second generation", is an informal term construed to refer to wealthy Chinese teenagers and young adults).

Relationships with the Red Cross Society of China
Guo Meimei was originally verified as an actor on Sina Weibo. Later she filed an application to change her title to the general manager of Red Cross Commerce, which Sina Weibo didn't check carefully, according to Weibo's statement. Her display of pictures showing a lavish lifestyle, driving a Mercedes, and owning a big mansion drew skepticism from people who questioned if her wealth came from the Red Cross Society of China and if the charity had misused its donations from the public.

Guo said Wang Jun once told her that he was planning to invest in a company which had some ties with the Red Cross Society of China and joked that he could get her a manager's position there. Guo said Wang, a real estate developer, withdrew his investment totaling 10 million yuan (US$1.55 million) from the China Red Cross Bo'an Asset Management Co after the scandal broke in June.
"I felt deeply sorry. I didn't mean to (cause so much trouble)," said Guo, adding that she had never spent 1 yuan from the non-profit Red Cross to finance her lifestyle.

In the face of mounting online anger, Guo Meimei responded on her microblog saying she had no relationship with the Red Cross.

She also said she wasn't the daughter of the organization's president or the granddaughter of Guo Moruo, a late Chinese scholar.

Legacy
Shortly after, donations to the Red Cross Society of China plummeted and the organisation issued a statement distancing itself from Guo, stating there was no relation between the two. Due to the Chinese Red Cross's lack of internal transparency and its already poor public credibility following previous scandals, the collective outburst of public doubt triggered by this incident hardly came as a surprise.

Sentence
In July 2014, Guo was arrested in Beijing for illegal betting on the World Cup. Prosecutors said Guo had organized poker sessions at a rented apartment in the capital in March, June and July 2013 with about 2.14 million yuan at stake. A police investigation revealed she took a cut of between 3 and 5 percent on each game played. In court, Guo claimed she wasn't running a casino but just gambling. In Chinese law, the sentence for running a casino can be up to 10 years while gambling carries a maximum three-year term. The CCTV program aired last August claimed that Guo paid for her luxurious lifestyle, which included expensive handbags and luxury cars, by charging hundreds of thousands of yuan for sexual trade.

On September 10, 2015, Guo was sentenced for 5 years in prison and fined 50,000 yuan for running an illegal casino.

On July 13, 2019, Guo was released from prison in Hunan after serving her 5 years sentence.

On March 18, 2021, Guo was rearrested in Shanghai for selling diet products contain Sibutramine, a drug which has been withdrawn from the market in China since 2010.

On October 18, 2021, Guo was sentenced for 2 years and 6 months in prison and fined 200,000 yuan for selling banned drugs.

References

1991 births
Living people
People from Yiyang
Chinese Internet celebrities
Beijing Film Academy alumni
21st-century Chinese criminals
Chinese criminals
Red Cross Society of China